Michael David Bishop may refer to:
 Michael Bishop, Baron Glendonbrook (born 1942), British businessman and politician
 Mike Bishop (baseball) (1958–2005), Major League Baseball player

See also 
 Michael Bishop (disambiguation)